List of Volkswagen Group diesel engines. The compression-ignition diesel engines listed below are currently  used by various marques of automobiles and commercial vehicles of the German automotive concern, Volkswagen Group, and also in Volkswagen Marine and Volkswagen Industrial Motor applications. All listed engines operate on the four-stroke cycle, and unless stated otherwise, use a wet sump lubrication system, and are water-cooled.

Previous Volkswagen Group Diesel engines are in the list of discontinued Volkswagen Group diesel engines article.

Three- and four-cylinder EA111 diesels

The EA111 series of internal combustion engines was introduced in the mid-1970s in the Audi 50, and shortly after in the original Volkswagen Polo. They are a series of water-cooled inline three- and inline four-cylinder petrol and Diesel engines, with a variety of displacements. They feature an overhead camshaft with a crossflow cylinder head design and directly driven auxiliary units. The engine is mounted transversely with the exhaust ports towards the front of the vehicle.

EA288
The EA288 engine family is based on the EA189 engine family. EA288 diesel shares displacement, stroke and bore ratio with the EA189 and the new EA211 gasoline engines. It is a family of 3-cylinder and 4-cylinder diesel engines featuring modular diesel engine system (MDB (Modularer Dieselmotorbaukasten)), with dual-loop EGR system, with high pressure EGR and a cooled low-pressure EGR loops; variable valve train (VVT) with a camshaft adjuster, Bosch CRS 2-20 2000 bar common rail injection system, cylinder pressure control, a modular close-coupled aftertreatment system that includes a flow-through catalyst followed by a wall-flow diesel particulate filter (DPF). Euro 6 and US Tier 2 emission compliance is achieved via NOx adsorber-based system for smaller size vehicles or urea-SCR system for larger vehicles. Other features included low-friction bearings for the camshaft and balancer shafts, piston rings that have less pre-tension, a two-stage oil pump with volumetric flow control.

The engine's displacement was either 1.6 or 2.0 liters, with power output between 66 and 176 kW.

The engine was to be first used in 2015 model years of Volkswagen Golf, Volkswagen Beetle, Volkswagen Passat, and Volkswagen Jetta.

Three-cylinder diesels

1.2 R3 12v TDI CR 55kW
Origins Motor type: EA 189 / All R3 1199 ccm three cylinder engines are derived from the R4 1598 ccm 4 cylinder engine, VW just cut off one 399,5 ccm cylinder.

identification parts code prefix: 03P, ID code: CFWA
cylinder block & crankcase cast iron
cylinder head & valvetrain cast aluminium alloy; four valves per cylinder, 12 valves total, double overhead camshaft (DOHC)
aspiration: turbocharger, intercooler, water-cooled exhaust gas recirculation
fuel system & engine management Delphi Multec Diesel Common rail System
DIN-rated power & torque output  at 4,200 rpm;  at 2,000 rpm
applications 2009- Volkswagen Polo Mk5 (BlueMotion model with longer last two gears), 2010- SEAT Ibiza Mk5 Ecomotive, 2010- Škoda Fabia Mk2, 2010- Škoda Roomster,

1.4 R3 6v TDI PD 51-66kW

Origins
All R3 1422 ccm three cylinder engines are derived from the R4 1896 ccm 4 cylinder engine, VW just cut off one 474,1 ccm cylinder.

identification parts code prefix: 045
cylinder block & crankcase grey cast iron with bed-plate frame; inner and outer two-part oil sump; die-forged steel cross-plane crankshaft with 120 degree crankpins with four main bearings, simplex roller chain driven balance shaft; Mahle pistons; water:oil cooler
cylinder head & valvetrain cast aluminium alloy, non-crossflow; two valves per cylinder, 6 valves total, each with two concentric valve springs, bucket tappets with manually adjustable rocker arms for valve clearance; timing belt-driven single overhead camshaft (SOHC)
aspiration Bosch hot-film air mass meter, cast alloy Siemens-VDO throttle body with electronically controlled 'drive by wire' throttle butterfly valve, cast aluminium alloy intake manifold; Garrett variable turbine geometry (not all models) turbocharger incorporated in exhaust manifold,  absolute boost; side-mounted intercooler (SMIC)
fuel system & engine management low-pressure fuel lift pump, underfloor fuel cooler; Pumpe Düse (PD) high-pressure direct injection (with three camshaft pressurised solenoid operated combustion chamber sited Unit Injectors), Bosch EDC15P+ or EDC17 electronic engine control unit
exhaust system cooled exhaust gas recirculation, oxidising catalytic converter, EU4 compliance
dimensions 
DIN-rated power & torque outputs, ID codes
 at 4,000 rpm;  at 1,600-2,800 rpm — (BNM:- Polo: 04/05-, Ibiza & Cordoba: 05/05-, Fabia: 10/05-, Roomster: 07/06-), (BWB:- Polo: 05/06-)
 at 4,000 rpm;  at 2,200 rpm — (AMF:- Polo: 10/99-09/01, Arosa: 10/99-05/03, Lupo: 05/99-07/05, A2: 06/00-08/03, Ibiza & Cordoba: 05/05-12/05, Fabia: 04/03-10/05), (BAY:- Polo: 11/03-06/05, 11/14-) (BHC:- A2: 09/03-08/05)
 at 4,000 rpm;  at 2,200 rpm — (BMS:- Polo BlueMotion: 05/06-, Ibiza & Cordoba: 06/06-, Roomster DPF: 07/06-, Fabia DPF/GreenLine: 01/07-) (BNV:- Polo: 04/05-05/08, Ibiza & Cordoba: 05/05-, Fabia: 10/05-, Roomster: 05/06-)
 at 4,000 rpm;  at 1,900-2,300 rpm — (ATL:- VW Polo: 01/00-04/00, 11/14- ) (A2: 11/03-08/05)

applications - actual Audi A1, Škoda Fabia, Škoda Roomster, Volkswagen Polo various models,
applications - discontinued Audi A2, SEAT Arosa(51 kW), SEAT Ibiza, SEAT Córdoba, Volkswagen Lupo, Volkswagen Fox

references

awards

was winner of the "1.0-litre to 1.4-litre" category in the 2001 annual competition for International Engine of the Year

Four-cylinder diesels

EA827 diesels

1.5 R4 16v TDI CR 66-81kW
identification Motor type: EA 189 /parts code prefix: 03L
engine configuration & engine displacementinline four-cylinder (R4/I4) Turbocharged Direct Injection (TDI) turbodiesel; ; bore x stroke: , stroke ratio: 0.96:1 - 'undersquare engine', 374.5 cc per cylinder.

cylinder block & crankcase: grey cast iron; five main bearings, die-forged steel crankshaft
cylinder head & valvetrain cast aluminium alloy; four valves per cylinder, 16 valves total, double overhead camshaft (DOHC)
aspiration turbocharger, intercooler, water-cooled exhaust gas recirculation (EGR)
DIN-rated power & torque outputs, ID codes
 at 4,200 rpm;  at 1,500-2,500 rpm — CWXA
 at 4,000 rpm;  at 1,500-3,000 rpm — CWXB, CWXC (Polo GT TDI)
applicationsŠkoda Rapid (India), Volkswagen Polo Mk5, Volkswagen Ameo, Volkswagen Vento
reference

1.6 R4 16v TDI CR 55-85kW (EA189)

identificationMotor type: EA 189 /parts code prefix: 03L
engine configuration & engine displacementinline four-cylinder (R4/I4) Turbocharged Direct Injection (TDI) turbodiesel; ; bore x stroke: , stroke ratio: 0.99:1 - 'square engine', 399.5 cc per cylinder, compression ratio: 16.5:1

cylinder block & crankcase grey cast iron; five main bearings, die-forged steel crankshaft

cylinder head & valvetraincast aluminium alloy; four valves per cylinder, 16 valves total, double overhead camshaft (DOHC)
aspirationturbocharger, intercooler, water-cooled exhaust gas recirculation (EGR)
DIN-rated power & torque outputs, ID codes
 at 4,000 rpm;  at 1,500-2,500 rpm — CAYA (Polo and Fabia only)
 at 3,000-4,000 rpm;  at 1,500-2,250 rpm — CAYE (Caddy only)
 at 4,200 rpm;  at 1,500-2,500 rpm — CAYB
 at 4,400 rpm;  at 1,500-2,500 rpm — CAYD (Caddy only)
 at 4,400 rpm;  at 1,500-2,500 rpm — CAYC
 at 4,400 rpm;  at 2,000-2,500 rpm — CEKA (Mexico only) 
applicationsSEAT Ibiza Mk4, SEAT Ibiza Mk5, SEAT León Mk2, SEAT Altea, SEAT Altea XL, Škoda Fabia Mk2, Škoda Roomster, Škoda Octavia Mk2, Škoda Superb, Škoda Rapid (2012), Škoda Rapid (India), Volkswagen Polo Mk5, Volkswagen Golf Mk6, Volkswagen Golf Mk7, Volkswagen Golf Plus, Volkswagen Golf Variant, Volkswagen Touran, Audi A1, Audi A3, Volkswagen Caddy, Volkswagen Vento, Volkswagen Jetta, Volkswagen Passat (B6), Volkswagen Passat (B7)
reference

1.6 R4 16v TDI CR 55-88kW (EA288)

identificationparts code prefix: 04L
engine configuration & engine displacementinline four-cylinder (R4/I4) Turbocharged Direct Injection (TDI) turbodiesel; ; bore x stroke: , stroke ratio: 0.99:1 - 'square engine', 399.5 cc per cylinder, compression ratio: 16.2:1

cylinder block & crankcasegrey cast iron; five main bearings, die-forged steel crankshaft

cylinder head & valvetraincast aluminium alloy; four valves per cylinder, 16 valves total, double overhead camshaft (DOHC)
aspirationturbocharger, intercooler, water-cooled exhaust gas recirculation (EGR)
DIN-rated power & torque outputs, ID codes
 at 3,000 rpm;  at 1,500-2,750 rpm — CLHB
 at 3,000 rpm;  at 1,500-3,000 rpm — CXXA, DDYB
 at 3,000 rpm;  at 1,500-2,750 rpm — CLHA
 at 3,000 rpm;  at 1,500-3,000 rpm — CXXB, DBKA
 at 3,000 rpm;  at 1,500-2,750 rpm — CRKB
 at 3,000 rpm;  at 1,500-2,750 rpm — DDYA
 at 3,000 rpm;  at 1,500-2,750 rpm — DCXA, DCZA

1.9 R4 8v SD 36kW
This is a naturally aspirated (non-turbo) indirect injection version of the 1.9 SDI VE37
identification parts code prefix: 028, ID code: 436
engine configuration & engine displacement inline-four engine (R4/I4); ; bore x stroke: , stroke ratio: 0.83:1 - undersquare/long-stroke, 474.1 cc per cylinder, compression ratio: 18,5:1
cylinder block & crankcase grey cast iron; five main bearings, die-forged steel crankshaft
cylinder head & valvetrain cast aluminium alloy; two valves per cylinder, 8 valves total, bucket tappets, single overhead camshaft (SOHC)
aspiration cast aluminium alloy intake manifold, cast iron exhaust manifold
fuel system & engine management Bosch VE 37 series distributor injection pump, indirect injection into swirl pre-chambers
EWG-rated power & torque output  at 3,000 rpm;  at 1,800 rpm
application Volkswagen Industrial Motor
reference

1.9 R4 SDI 29-50kW
This is a naturally aspirated (non-turbo) Suction Diesel Injection version of the 1.9 TDI VP37
identification parts code prefix: 028 or 038; ID codes: AGD, AGP, ASX, ASY, AYQ, AQM
engine configuration & engine displacement inline four-cylinder (R4/I4) Suction Diesel Injection (SDI); ; bore x stroke: , stroke ratio: 0.83:1 - undersquare/long-stroke, 474.1 cc per cylinder, compression ratio: 18.5:1 (44 kW - 18.5:1)
cylinder block & crankcase grey cast iron; five main bearings, die-forged steel crankshaft
cylinder head & valvetrain cast aluminium alloy; two valves per cylinder, 8 valves total, bucket tappets, single overhead camshaft (SOHC)
aspiration cast aluminium alloy intake manifold, cast iron exhaust manifold
fuel system & engine management Bosch VP37 (VerteilerPumpe) electronic distributor injection pump, direct injection (DI) with five-hole nozzles, Bosch EDC 15V+ electronic engine control unit (ECU)
dimensions mass:  (dry weight, Marine variants)
EWG-rated power & torque outputs, ID codes, application
 at 2,800 rpm;— BXT Volkswagen Industrial Motor 430 (05/06->)
 at 3,600 rpm;  at 2,200 rpm — AEY Volkswagen Industrial Motor 444
DIN-rated power & torque outputs, ID codes, applications
 at 2,600 rpm;  at 2,000 rpm — BGM Volkswagen Marine 40-4 (02/03->)
 — BEQ Volkswagen Marine (02/02->)
 at 3,000 rpm;  at 2,000 rpm — BGL Volkswagen Marine 50-4 (02/03->)
 at 3,600 rpm;  at 2,000 rpm — ANC Volkswagen Marine 60-4 (02/03->)
 at 4,200 rpm;  at 1,600-2,800 rpm — ASY
 at 4,000 rpm;  at 1,800 rpm — AQM
applications VW Polo 6N/6KV (AEY: 12/95-08/99), VW Polo 9N/9N3 (ASY: 10/01-04/05), VW Golf Mk3 & VW Golf Mk4 (AEY: 07/95-02/99), VW Vento (AEY: 07/95-12/97), VW Caddy Mk2 (AEY: 11/95-09/00), Škoda Fabia, SEAT Ibiza Mk2/SEAT Cordoba 6K (AEY: 09/95-06/99), SEAT León Mk1 (1M) (AQM: 06/00-10/03), SEAT Inca (AEY: 11/95-09/00), Volkswagen Jetta King (ASY: 04/02-03/10), Volkswagen Jetta Pioneer (ASY: 03/10-03/13)
reference

1.9 R4 8v TDI 29-81kW
identification parts code prefix: 038, 064 (Volkswagen Marine)
engine configuration & engine displacement inline four-cylinder (R4/I4) Turbocharged Direct Injection (TDI) turbodiesel; ; bore x stroke: , stroke ratio: 0.83:1 - undersquare/long-stroke, 474.1 cc per cylinder, compression ratio: 19.5:1
cylinder block & crankcase grey cast iron; five main bearings, die-forged steel crankshaft, fracture-split forged steel connecting rods, Mahle or Alcan pistons, simplex belt-driven oil pump, cast aluminium alloy baffled oil sump
cylinder head & valvetrain cast aluminium alloy; two valves per cylinder, 8 valves total, bucket tappets, timing belt-driven single overhead camshaft (SOHC)
aspiration hot-wire mass air flow (MAF) sensor, cast aluminium alloy intake manifold, Garrett or KKK turbocharger, side-mounted intercooler (SMIC), exhaust gas recirculation (EGR), cast iron exhaust manifold
fuel system & engine management timing belt-driven Bosch VP37 (VerteilerPumpe) electronic distributor injection pump, direct injection (DI) with five-hole nozzles, Bosch MSA 12, MSA 15.5, EDC 15V+, EDC 15VM+V electronic engine control unit (Marine variant uses MDC)
dimensions mass:  (Marine variants, dry weight)
EWG-rated power & torque output, ID code, application
 — AFD: Volkswagen Industrial Motor - 480 (04/94-01/02)
DIN-rated power & torque outputs, ID codes
 — CDX Volkswagen Marine (10/07->) 
 at 3,600 rpm;  at 2,000 rpm — CDX Volkswagen Marine (10/07->)
 at 4,000 rpm;  at 1,900 rpm — 1Z, AHU
 at 3,750 rpm;  at 1,900 rpm — AGR, AHH, ALE, ALH
 at 4,150 rpm;  at 1,900 rpm — AFN, AHF, ASV, AVB, AVG
applications
Audi

 A3 (8L): AHU (09/96-08/00), AHF (01/97-04/02), ALH (08/97-06/01), ASV (09/99-06/01)
 80 (B4): 1Z (09/91-07/95)
 Cabriolet: 1Z (07/95-07/96), AHU (07/96-08/00)
 A4 (B5): 1Z (01/95-07/96), AFN (02/96-07/99), AHU (08/96-06/00), AHH (04/97-09/01), AVG (08/99-06/00)
 A6 (C4): 1Z (07/94-06/96), AHU (07/96-10/97)
 A6 (C5): AFN (04/97-04/01), AVG (08/99-10/00)

Ford

 Galaxy Mk1: 1Z (03/96-07/96), AHU (07/96-02/00), AFN/AVG (09/97-02/00)

SEAT

 Ibiza (6K): 1Z (07/96-12/96), AHU (12/96-06/99), AFN (03/97-06/99), ASV (03/99-05/02), AGR (04/99-05/02), ALH (10/99-05/02)
 Córdoba (6K): 1Z (07/96-12/96), AHU (12/96-06/99), AFN (03/97-06/99), ASV (03/99-08/02), AGR (04/99-08/02), ALH (10/99-05/01)
 León 1M (Mk1): ASV (10/99-10/05), AGR/AHF (11/99-09/02), ALH (05/00-10/05)
 Toledo (1L): 1Z (04/95-12/96), AHU (06/96-03/99), AFN (12/96-03/99)
 Toledo (1M): ALH (03/99-07/04), AGR (04/99-09/02), AHF (10/98-09/02), ASV (10/99-07/04)
 Alhambra (7M): 1Z (03/96-07/96), AHU (07/96-02/00), AFN/AVG (09/97-02/00)

Škoda

 Octavia (1U): AGR/ALH (10/96-??/05), AHF/ASV (08/97-??/05)

Volkswagen

 Polo (6N/6KV) (Classic/Variant): AHU (01/97-08/99), ALE (11/97-08/99), AFN (06/98-08/99), AGR/ALH/ASV (10/99-09/01) 
 Golf (1H): 1Z (07/93-07/96, AFN (02/96-08/99), AHU (07/96-06/00)
 Vento/Jetta (1H): 1Z (07/93-07/96), AFN (02/96-12/97), ALE (01/97-12/97), AHU (08/96-??/??)
 Golf (1J): AHF (10/97-05/06), AGR/ALH (10/97-05/06), ASV (05/00-05/06), ALE(Golf 3.5 Cabrio only) (??/98-??/02)
 Bora/Jetta (1J): AHF/ALH (09/98-05/055, AGR (10/98-05/05), ALH (11/98-05/05), ASV (05/00-05/05)
 New Beetle (1C/9C): (ALH 01/98-06/04)
 Passat (B3): 1Z (10/93-12/96)
 Passat (B4): AFN (03/96-06/96)
 Passat (B5): AFN (03/96-08/99), AHU (08/96-08/00), AHH (05/98-08/00), AVG (08/99-08/00)
 Sharan (7M): 1Z (09/95-07/96), AHU (08/96-10/00), AFN (12/96-07/99)
 Caddy (9K): 1Z (10/96-03/97), AHU (10/96-09/00), ALE (09/97-09/00), ALH (09/00-06/03)

reference

1.9 R4 8v TDI PD 43-118kW
Essentially, this ubiquitous engine has the same bottom end (cylinder block/crankcase, crankshaft) as the earlier 1.9 R4 TDI which uses a VP37 VerteilerPumpe distributor injection pump. However, a new cylinder head is fitted to this "PD" engine, to accommodate "Pumpe Düse" Unit Injectors.
identification parts code prefix: 038, 03G
(VAG group indicate higher output models by a red 'I' on their TDI badge, e.g. 96 kW model Audi B6 A4. Because of this, the term 'red I' has entered into automotive technicians parlance)

engine configuration & engine displacement inline four-cylinder (R4/I4) Turbocharged Direct Injection (TDI) turbodiesel; ; bore x stroke: , stroke ratio: 0.83:1 - undersquare/long-stroke, 474.1 cc per cylinder, compression ratio: 19.0:1
cylinder block & crankcase grey cast iron; five main bearings, die-forged steel crankshaft, fracture-split forged steel connecting rods, Mahle or Alcan pistons, simplex roller chain-driven oil pump, cast aluminium alloy baffled oil sump
cylinder head & valvetrain cast aluminium alloy; two valves per cylinder, 8 valves total, bucket tappets, timing belt-driven single overhead camshaft (SOHC)
aspiration hot-wire mass air flow (MAF) sensor, cast aluminium alloy intake manifold, Garrett, KKK or BorgWarner variable turbine geometry turbocharger (VGT), side-mounted intercooler (SMIC), water-cooled exhaust gas recirculation (EGR), cast iron exhaust manifold
fuel system & engine management Pumpe Düse (PD) direct injection (DI): engine-driven vane-type low-pressure fuel lift pump, four camshaft-actuated (via roller rocker arms) high-pressure Bosch  Unit Injectors with solenoid valve injection nozzles, Bosch EDC 15, EDC 16 or EDC 17 electronic engine control unit (ECU) with altitude compensation
EWG-rated power & torque outputs, ID codes, applications
 — BEU: Volkswagen Industrial Motor (11/02->)
 — BJC: Volkswagen Industrial Motor (11/03->)
 — AVM: Volkswagen Industrial Motor (11/00->)
DIN-rated power & torque outputs, ID codes, applications
 at 4,000 rpm;  at 1,900 rpm — BSU
 Volkswagen Caddy Mk3 (09/05->)
 at 4,000 rpm;  at 1,800−2,500 rpm — BRU, BXF, BXJ
 SEAT Ibiza Mk4 (BXJ: 06/08->), SEAT León 1P (Mk2) (BXF: 06/07->), SEAT Altea (BXF: 08/09->), Volkswagen Golf Mk5 (BRU: 05/04-02/06, BXF: 02/06-11/08, BXJ: 11/07-11/08), VW Golf Plus (BXF: 05/07-12/08, BXJ: 11/07-12/08), Volkswagen Touran (BRU: 11/04-02/06, BXF: 02/06->, BXJ: 06/06->)
 at 4,000 rpm;  at 1,900 rpm — ANU
 Ford Galaxy, SEAT Alhambra (06/00->), Volkswagen Sharan (03/99->)
 at 4,000 rpm;  at 1,800–2,400 rpm — ATD, AXR, BEW, BMT
 Audi 8L A3 (Mk1) (ATD: 01/01-06/03, AXR: 11/01-06/03), SEAT Ibiza Mk3 (ATD: 09/01->, AXR: 05/05-11/09, BMT: 09/06-11/09), SEAT Córdoba Mk2 (ATD: 09/02->, AXR: 05/05->, BMT: 06/06-11/09), SEAT León 1M (Mk1) (AXR: 10/05-06/06), Škoda Fabia 6Y (Mk1) (ATD: 01/00-10/05, AXR: 10/05-12/07), Škoda Roomster (AXR: 03/06-05/06), Škoda Octavia 1U (Mk1) (ATD: 08/00-01/06, AXR: 10/05->), Volkswagen Polo Mk4 (ATD/AXR: 11/01->, BMT: 05/06->), Volkswagen Golf Mk4 (ATD: 02/00-06/06, AXR: 05/01-06/06), VW Bora/Jetta Mk4 (ATD: 05/00-05/06, AXR: 05/01-??/??, BEW: 07/03-??/??), Volkswagen Golf Mk5 (BEW: 08/03-??/??), VW Jetta Mk5 (AXR: 06/07-??/??), Volkswagen New Beetle (ATD: 10/00-??/??, AXR: 06/03-??/??, BEW: 07/03-??/??)
 at 4,000 rpm;  at 1,900 rpm — AVB, AVQ
 Audi B6 A4 (AVB: 04/01-05/04), Škoda Superb 3U (Mk1) (AVB: 06/02-10/05), Volkswagen Touran (AVQ: 02/03-05/04), VW Passat B5 (AVB: 02/00-05/05)
 at 4,000 rpm;  at 1,800 rpm — BSW
 Škoda Fabia 5J (Mk2) (04/07->), Škoda Roomster (05/06->), Volkswagen New Beetle (07/03->)
 at 4,000 rpm;  at 1,900 rpm — BJB, BKC, BLS, BSV, BXE
 Audi 8P A3 (Mk2) (BKC: 06/03-05/06, BLS: 10/05-05/10, BXE: 06/06-05/10), SEAT Ibiza 6J (Mk4) (BLS: 02/08->), SEAT León 1P (Mk2) (BKC: 07/05-02/06, BLS: 11/05->, BXE: 02/06->), SEAT Altea (BJB: 04/04-09/05, BKC: 04/04-05/06, BLS: 10/05->, BXE: 02/06->), SEAT Toledo Mk3 (BJB: 09/04-09/05, BKC: 09/04-02/06, BLS: 10/05-09/09, BXE: 02/06->), Škoda Fabia 5J (Mk2) (BLS: 04/07->), Škoda Roomster (BLS: 11/06->), Škoda Octavia 1Z (Mk2) (BJB: 02/04->, BKC: 05/04-02/06, BXE: 03/06->, BLS: 05/06->), Škoda Superb 3U (Mk1) (BSV: 10/05-05/07, BLS/BXE: 03/08->), Volkswagen Golf Mk5 (BKC: 10/03-07/07, BLS: 06/05->, BXE: 05/07->), VW Jetta Mk5 (BKC: 05/05-??/09, BLS: 08/05-??/09, BXE: 02/06-??/09), VW Golf Plus (BLS: 05/07-12/08, BXE: 05/07-01/09), Volkswagen Touran (BKC: 08/03-02/06, BLS: 06/05->, BXE: 02/06->), VW Passat B6 (BKC: 03/05-02/06, BLS: 06/05-11/08, BXE: 02/06-11/08), Volkswagen Caddy Mk3 (BJB: 02/04->, BLS: 06/05->)
 at 4,000 rpm;  at 1,900 rpm — BPZ
 Škoda Superb 3U (Mk1) (01/07-03/08)
 at 4,000 rpm;  at 1,900 rpm — AJM
 Audi B5 A4 (08/98-09/01), Audi C5 A6 (01/98-04/01), Volkswagen Golf Mk4 (05/99-04/02), VW Bora/Jetta Mk4 (11/98-07/01), VW Passat B5 (01/99-12/99)
 at 4,000 rpm;  at 1,900 rpm — ATJ, AUY, BVK
 Audi B5 A4 (ATJ: 01/00-09/01), Ford Galaxy Mk1, SEAT Alhambra (AUY: 06/00->, BVK: 11/05-05/08), Volkswagen Golf Mk4 (AUY: 01/00-07/01), VW Bora/Jetta Mk4 (AUY: 05/00-07/01), VW Passat B5 (ATJ: 01/00-08/00), Volkswagen Sharan (AUY: 04/00->, BVK: 11/05->)
 at 4,000 rpm;  at 1,750–2,500 rpm — AWX
 Audi B6 A4 (12/00-06/03), Audi C5 A6 (06/01-01/05), Škoda Superb 3U (Mk1) (12/01-03/08), VW Passat B5 (10/00-05/05)
 at 4,000 rpm;  at 1,900 rpm — ASZ, AVF, BLT
 Audi 8L A3 (Mk1) (ASZ: 05/00-06/03), Audi B6 A4 (AVF: 11/00-12/04), Audi C5 A6 (AVF: 06/01-01/05), Ford Galaxy Mk1, SEAT Ibiza Mk3 (ASZ: 11/01->, BLT: 05/05-07/09), SEAT Córdoba Mk2 (ASZ: 10/02->, BLT: 05/05->), SEAT León Mk1 (1M) (ASZ: 05/03-06/06), SEAT Toledo Mk2 (ASZ: 05/03-06/06), SEAT Alhambra (ASZ: 11/02->), Škoda Fabia Mk1 (6Y) (ASZ: 06/03-10/05, BLT: 10/05-04/07), Škoda Octavia 1U (Mk1) (ASZ: 09/02-09/04), Škoda Superb 3U (Mk1) (AVF: 01/04-03/08), Volkswagen Polo Mk4 (ASZ: 11/03->, BLT: 05/04->), Volkswagen Golf Mk4 (ASZ: 04/01-05/06), VW Bora/Jetta Mk4 (ASZ: 04/01-05/05), VW Passat B5 (AVF: 10/00-05/05), Volkswagen Sharan (ASZ: 11/02->)
 at 4,000 rpm;  at 1,900 rpm — ARL, BTB
 Ford Galaxy Mk1, SEAT León Mk1 (1M) (ARL: 09/00-12/05), SEAT Toledo Mk2 (ARL: 10/00-07/04), SEAT Alhambra (BTB: 06/05-05/07), Volkswagen Golf Mk4 (ARL: 09/00-05/06), VW Bora/Jetta Mk4 (ARL: 09/00-05/05), Volkswagen Sharan (BTB: 01/05-05/07)
 at 3,750 rpm;  at 1,900 rpm — BPX, BUK
 SEAT Ibiza Mk3 (BPX: 03/04->, BUK: 11/05-12/08) (engine exclusively developed by Audi for SEAT Sport)
reference

awards

was winner of the "1.8-litre to 2.0-litre" category in the 1999 annual competition for International Engine of the Year

Origins: All 1968 ccm four cylinder engines are derived from the 2461 ccm 5 cylinder Audi- engine, VW just cut off one 492,1 ccm cylinder.

2.0 R4 8v SDI PD 51-55kW
Origins Motor type: EA 188 / All R4 1968 ccm four cylinder engines are derived from the R5 2461 ccm 5 cylinder Audi- engine, VW just cut off one 492,1 ccm cylinder.

identification parts code prefix: 038
cylinder block & crankcase grey cast iron; five main bearings, die-forged steel crankshaft
cylinder head & valvetrain cast aluminium alloy; two valves per cylinder, 8 valves total, timing belt driven single overhead camshaft (SOHC)
fuel system & engine management Pumpe Düse (PD) Unit Injector direct injection (DI)
DIN-rated power & torque outputs, ID codes
 at 4,200 rpm;  at 2,200–2,400 rpm — Volkswagen Caddy Mk3: BDJ, BST
 at 4,200 rpm;  at 2,200–2,400 rpm — Volkswagen Golf Mk5: BDK

EA188

2.0 R4 8v TDI PD 47-103kW
identificationMotor type: EA 188 / parts code prefix: ???
engine configuration & engine displacement inline four-cylinder (R4/I4) Turbocharged Direct Injection (TDI) turbodiesel; ; bore x stroke: , stroke ratio: 0.85:1 - undersquare/long-stroke, 492.1 cc per cylinder; compression ratio: 18.5:1
cylinder block & crankcase grey cast iron; five main bearings, die-forged steel crankshaft, fracture-split forged steel connecting rods
cylinder head & valvetrain cast aluminium alloy; two valves per cylinder, 8 valves total, timing belt driven single overhead camshaft (SOHC)
aspiration turbocharger, intercooler
fuel system & engine management Pumpe Düse (PD) direct injection (DI): engine-driven vane-type low-pressure fuel lift pump, four camshaft-actuated (via roller rocker arms) high-pressure Bosch  Unit Injectors with solenoid valve injection nozzles, Bosch EDC 16 or EDC 17 or Siemens VDO SIMOS PPD1 electronic engine control unit (ECU) with altitude compensation, EU4 compliant
exhaust system diesel particulate filter (DPF) (not on Industrial variants)
EWG-rated power & torque outputs, ID codes, applications
 at 3,000 rpm;  at 1,750 rpm — Volkswagen Industrial Motor - 447 (CBH: 05/07->)
 — Volkswagen Industrial Motor - 455 (CBJ: 05/07->)
 at 3,000 rpm;  at 1,750 rpm — Volkswagen Industrial Motor - 463
 at 3,000 rpm;  at 1,750 rpm — Volkswagen Industrial Motor - 474 (CBK: 01/07->)
DIN-rated power & torque outputs, ID codes
 at 4,000 rpm;  at 1900 rpm — BGW, BHW
 at 4,000 rpm;  at 1,750-2500 rpm — BMM, BMP
applications Volkswagen Passat (B5), Volkswagen Golf Mk5, Volkswagen Eos, VW Jetta A5, Volkswagen Touran, Volkswagen Tiguan, VW Passat B6, Audi 8P A3, SEAT Leon, SEAT Altea and XL, SEAT Toledo, Škoda Octavia, Škoda Superb, Volkswagen Industrial Motor, Jeep Patriot
references

2.0 R4 16v TDI PD 100-125 kW 
Some models are fitted with a diesel particulate filter. According to Audi (UK) 'TDV' stands for Technology Development Vehicle. TDV denotes that a diesel particulate filter is present on the Audi in question but the vehicle was produced just prior to (or during) the legislation process regarding DPFs. The abbreviation 'DPF' was not yet officially in existence so Audi used the 'TDV' letters to identify the diesel particulate filter.

This Pumpe Düse (PD) TDI engine was introduced to replace the older higher-powered versions of the 1.9 TDI. It is the first four-cylinder 16-valve double overhead camshaft (DOHC) Turbocharged Direct Injection (TDI) engine made by Volkswagen Group.
identification Motor type: EA 188 / parts code prefix: 038
engine configuration & engine displacement inline four-cylinder (R4/I4) Turbocharged Direct Injection (TDI) turbodiesel; ; bore x stroke: , stroke ratio: 0.85:1 - undersquare/long-stroke, 492.1 cc per cylinder; compression ratio: 18.5:1
cylinder block & crankcase grey cast iron; five main bearings, die-forged steel crankshaft, fracture-split forged steel connecting rods, cast aluminium alloy oil sump
cylinder head & valvetrain cast aluminium alloy; four valves per cylinder, 16 valves total, timing belt-driven double overhead camshaft (DOHC)
aspiration hot-film air mass meter, Garrett turbocharger integrated into cast iron exhaust manifold, sandwiched central front-mounted intercooler (FMIC)
fuel system & engine management Pumpe Düse (PD) direct injection (DI): engine-driven vane-type low-pressure fuel lift pump, four camshaft-actuated (via roller rocker arms) high-pressure  Unit Injectors with piezo valve injection nozzles (Siemens VDO on 125 kW, Bosch on 103 kW), Bosch EDC 16 or EDC 17 or Siemens VDO SIMOS PPD1 electronic engine control unit (ECU) with altitude compensation, EU4 compliant
exhaust system water-cooled exhaust gas recirculation (EGR), diesel particulate filter (DPF) (only on 125 kW and TDV (Technology Development Vehicle) denoted models )
DIN-rated power & torque outputs, ID codes
 — AZV, BMA
 — BKD, BKP, BRE
 at 4,200 rpm;  at 1,800-2,500 rpm — BMN, BMR, BRD
applications Audi 8P A3, Audi B7 A4, Audi B8 A4, Audi C6 A6, Jeep Patriot 2.0CRD (BKD: 09/07) SEAT León Mk2, Škoda Octavia (BKD: 11/08->), Škoda Superb (BKD: 01/09->), Volkswagen Golf Mk5, VW Jetta Mk5, Volkswagen Touran, VW Passat B6, Mitsubishi Lancer, Mitsubishi Grandis, Mitsubishi Outlander (BWC), Chrysler Sebring, Chrysler Sebring (convertible), Dodge Avenger, Dodge Caliber (MY07 BKD, MY08 BMR), Dodge Journey, Jeep Compass, Jeep Patriot
reference

EA189

2.0 R4 16v TDI CR 81-132kW 
The EA189 engine is the focus of the Volkswagen emissions scandal.
identificationMotor type: EA189 / parts code prefix: 03L, ID codes: CAGA, CAGC, CAHA, CBEA, CBAB, CFFB, CFFD, CBBB, CBDB, CBDC, CEGA, CFGB, CFGC, CFCA, CFJA, CFJB, CJAA, CLJA
engine configuration & engine displacement inline four-cylinder (R4/I4) Turbocharged Direct Injection (TDI) turbodiesel; ;bore x stroke: , stroke ratio: 0.85:1 - undersquare/long-stroke, 492.1 cc per cylinder, compression ratio: 18:1 (103 kW), 16.5:1 (125 kW)
cylinder block & crankcase grey cast iron; five main bearings, die-forged steel crankshaft, fracture-split forged steel connecting rods, two counter-rotating gear-driven balance shafts turning at half crankshaft speed, Alcan or Federal-Mogul pistons, cast aluminium alloy oil sump
cylinder head & valvetrain cast aluminium alloy; four valves per cylinder, 16 valves total, low-friction roller finger cam followers with automatic hydraulic valve clearance compensation, timing belt and gear-driven (relay method: belt drives exhaust camshaft from Rear of engine, inlet camshaft is driven at rear of engine by gear from exhaust camshaft) double overhead camshaft (DOHC)
aspiration hot-film air mass meter, electronically regulated variable geometry turbocharger integrated into cast iron exhaust manifold, central front-mounted intercooler (FMIC)
aspiration (147 kW) twin registered turbochargers with different diameters
fuel system & engine management low-pressure fuel tank mounted fuel lift pump with underfloor electric fuel relay pump, timing belt-driven high-pressure injection pump delivering up to  pressure for the common rail (CR) fuel rail, direct injection (DI) with eight-nozzle output piezo fuel injectors; Bosch EDC 17 electronic engine control unit (ECU)
exhaust system water-cooled exhaust gas recirculation (EGR), catalytic converter, diesel particulate filter (DPF), nitrogen oxide catalytic converter, sulphur catalytic converter.
DIN-rated power & torque outputs, ID codes, applications
 at 4,200 rpm;  at 1,500–2,500 rpm — CBDC, CFFD
 at 4,000 rpm;  at 1,750–2,500 rpm — CAGC SEAT Exeo (09/09->)
 — CAGB(AUDI A6 C6 CR)
 at 3,750-4,150 rpm;  at 1,750–2,800 rpm — CFHC, CBEA, CBAB, CFFB Volkswagen Passat B7, CBDB, CJAA Volkswagen Golf Mk6
 at 4,200 rpm;  at 1,750–2,500 rpm — Audi B8 A4, Audi Q5, SEAT Exeo (CAGA: 12/08->)
 at 3,500 rpm;  at 1,750–3,000 rpm — CRBC Audi A3, Golf VII, Golf VIII, SEAT Leon
 at 4,200 rpm;  at 1,750–2,500 rpm — CAHA Audi A6 C6 (facelift), Audi A5 8T, CBBB Volkswagen Passat CC, CFGB Audi TT 2.0 TDI quattro, Audi 8P A3, Volkswagen Tiguan 5N, Volkswagen Golf Mk6, Škoda Superb 2, Škoda Octavia RS TDI (CEGA: 2008->), SEAT Exeo (CAHA: 02/09->), CEGA, CFJA SEAT Leon
 at 4,200 rpm;  at 1,750–2,500 rpm— CGLC  Audi A4, Audi A5, Audi A6 C7, CFJB Volkswagen Touran, CFGC  Audi Q3, Volkswagen Passat B7
 at 4,000 rpm;  at 1,500–2,000 rpm — CFCA Volkswagen Transporter (T5) GP biturbo
applications Audi TT Mk2 2.0 TDI quattro (CBBB: 06/08-05/10), Audi 8P A3 (CBBB: 07/08->), Audi B8 A4, Audi Q5, SEAT Leon Mk2 (1P), SEAT Altea, SEAT Toledo Mk3 (5P), SEAT Exeo, Škoda Octavia Mk2 (1Z) (125 kW), Škoda Superb Mk2 (3T) (103/125 kW), Škoda Yeti (81/103/125 kW), Volkswagen Golf Mk6, VW Jetta Mk5 TDI CleanDiesel (103 kW), Volkswagen Tiguan, Volkswagen Passat CC, Volkswagen Passat, Volkswagen Transporter (T5)
references

2.0 R4 16v TDI CR 81-176kW (EA288) 
identificationMotor type: EA288 / parts code prefix: 04L
engine configuration & engine displacementinline four-cylinder (R4/I4) Turbocharged Direct Injection (TDI) turbodiesel; ;bore x stroke: , stroke ratio: 0.85:1 - undersquare/long-stroke, 492.1 cc per cylinder, compression ratio: 16.2:1 (110 kW), 15.8:1 (140 kW), 15.5:1 (176 kW)
cylinder block & crankcasegrey cast iron; five main bearings, die-forged steel crankshaft, fracture-split forged steel connecting rods, two counter-rotating gear-driven balance shafts turning at half crankshaft speed
cylinder head & valvetraincast aluminium alloy; four valves per cylinder, 16 valves total, low-friction roller finger cam followers with automatic hydraulic valve clearance compensation, timing belt and double overhead camshaft (DOHC)
aspirationhot-film air mass meter, electronically regulated variable geometry turbocharger integrated into cast iron exhaust manifold, air-to-water intercooler
fuel system & engine managementlow-pressure fuel tank mounted fuel lift pump with underfloor electric fuel relay pump, timing belt-driven high-pressure injection pump delivering up to  pressure for the common rail (CR) fuel rail
exhaust systemwater-cooled exhaust gas recirculation (EGR), catalytic converter, diesel particulate filter (DPF), nitrogen oxide catalytic converter, sulphur catalytic converter.
DIN-rated power & torque outputs, ID codes, applications
 at 2,400 rpm;  at 1,200 rpm — DFSC, DFSD, DFSF Caddy 2K
 at 3,000 - 4,000 rpm;  at 1,750–3,000 rpm — Passat B8 Golf SV
 at 3,000 - 4,000 rpm;  at 1,750–3,000 rpm — CRLB, DFEA, DFEB, DFGA Passat B8
 at 3,500 rpm;  at 1,750–3,000 rpm — CRBC Audi A3, Golf VII, Golf VIII, SEAT Leon
 at 4,000 rpm;  at 1,750–3,000 rpm — CUNA, CUPA Audi A3, Golf VII, SEAT Leon
 at 3,500 - 4,000 rpm;  at 1,750–3,000 rpm — DDAA, DFCA Passat B8
 at 3,800 rpm;  — CNHA Audi B8 A4, Volkswagen Passat 2015<
 at 3,800 rpm;  — CNHA Volkswagen Golf GTD MK8, Škoda Octavia RS
 at 4,000 rpm;  — CUAA Volkswagen Passat 2015 TDI BiTurbo, Volkswagen Arteon By making all kinds of adjustments of the little brother 2.0 mono TDI, they developed the big brother 2.0 TDI BiTurbo engine. We may think this engine is similar to the mono version, however this is not the case at all. This new engine is very different from the MTDI - mono TDI - or in other words some crucial parts has been redeveloped from scratch. Without this adjustments the long life time of the engine would be greatly reduced. In the ref. document you can find important elements concerning the changes in composition, thickness of materials, construction, new developed component such as crankhouse, additional parts (electric cooling) etc.  By googling "The_New_Four-Cylinder_TDI_Biturbo_Engine_from_Volkswagen" you may learn more.

Five-cylinder diesels

2.5 R5 SDI 40-55kW
identificationparts code prefix: ???
engine configuration & engine displacement inline five-cylinder (R5) Suction Diesel Injection (SDI); ; bore x stroke: , stroke ratio: 0.85:1 - undersquare/long-stroke, 492.1 cc per cylinder, compression ratio: 19.0:1
cylinder block & crankcase grey cast iron; six main bearings, die-forged steel crossplane[crankshaft, 'bowl in piston' combustion chamber
cylinder head & valvetrain cast aluminium alloy; two valves per cylinder, 10 valves total, hydraulic bucket tappets with automatic valve clearance compensation, timing belt-driven single overhead camshaft (SOHC), swirl-inducing intake ports
aspiration cast aluminium alloy intake manifold, cast iron exhaust manifold (water-cooled in marine applications)
fuel system & engine management rubber toothed belt-driven Bosch VP37 electronic distributor injection pump, two-stage direct injection (DI) with five-hole injector nozzles; Bosch MDC Marine Diesel Control electronic engine control unit
mass  (Marine versions: dry weight, with DMF, all ancillaries and cooling system)
DIN-rated (Marine to ISO 8178-4) power & torque outputs, applications, ID codes
 at 2,500 rpm (16.3 kW/L);  at 2,250 rpm — Volkswagen Marine SDI 55-5 (BCT: 02/02-on)
 at 3,600 rpm (22.3 kW/L);  at 2,250 rpm — Volkswagen Marine SDI 75-5 (ANF: 02/02-on)
 (22.3 kW/L);  at 2,250 rpm — Volkswagen LT (LT28 & LT35) (AGX: 05/96-04/01)
references

2.5 R5 TDI 65-121kW
This 2.5-litre inline five engine (R5), wholly designed and developed by Audi, was the first Turbocharged Direct Injection (TDI) diesel engine in 1989, initially used in the Audi 100. This engine was also used in some Volvo Cars models in the 1990s.
identificationparts code prefix: ???, ID codes: 1T, AAT, ACV, AEL, AHY, AJT, ANG, ANH, ANJ, AXG, BBR, BCU, BCV, BTW, Volvo D5252T
engine configuration & engine displacement inline five-cylinder (R5) Turbocharged Direct Injection (TDI) turbodiesel; ; bore x stroke: , stroke ratio: 0.85:1 - undersquare/long-stroke, 492.1 cc per cylinder, compression ratio: 19.0:1
cylinder block & crankcase grey cast iron; six main bearings, die-forged steel crossplane crankshaft, 'bowl in piston' combustion chamber
cylinder head & valvetrain cast aluminium alloy; two valves per cylinder, 10 valves total, hydraulic bucket tappets with automatic valve clearance compensation, timing belt-driven single overhead camshaft (SOHC), swirl-inducing intake ports
aspiration cast aluminium alloy intake manifold, cast iron exhaust manifold (water-cooled in marine applications), Garrett Variable Turbine Geometry (VTG) variable-vane turbocharger (water-cooled in marine applications), sea-water intercooler on Marine 108 kW and above
fuel system & engine management rubber toothed belt-driven Bosch VP37 electronic distributor injection pump, two-stage direct injection (DI) with five-hole injector nozzles, Bosch MDC Marine Diesel Control electronic engine control unit
mass Marine variants:  (dry weight, with DMF, all ancillaries and cooling system)
EWG-rated power & torque outputs, application, ID code
 (32.5 kW/L) — Volkswagen Industrial Motor (BBR: 07/92->)
DIN-rated power & torque outputs, applications, ID codes
 (26.4 kW/L);  at 1,900 rpm — Volkswagen Transporter (T4)
 at 2,600 rpm (30.1 kW/L);  at 2,500 rpm — Volkswagen Marine TDI 100-5 (BCU: 02/02->)
 (30.5 kW/L);  at 1,900 rpm — Volkswagen Transporter (T4)
 (32.5 kW/L);  at 1,900 rpm — Volkswagen LT
 (34.5 kW/L);  at 1,900 rpm — Audi C4 100
 at 3,250 rpm (35.8 kW/L);  at 2,500 rpm — Audi C3 100, Volkswagen Marine TDI 120-5 (ANG: 02/02->)
 (41.9 kW/L);  at 1,900 rpm — Audi C4 A6, as Volvo D5252T: Volvo 850, Volvo S70, Volvo V70 (first and second generation), early Volvo S80s (AEL/D5252T: 09/94->)
 at 4,000 rpm (43.9 kW/L);  at 1,900 rpm — Volkswagen Marine TDI 150-5D (BCV: 02/02->)
 (45.1 kW/L);  at 1,900 rpm — Volkswagen Transporter (T4) (AHY, AXG: xx/98-xx/03)
 at 3,500 rpm (45.1 kW/L);  at 1,700-3,100 rpm — Volkswagen Marine TDI 140-5 (???: ??/??->)
 at 4,000 rpm (45.1 kW/L);  at 2,500 rpm — Volkswagen Marine TDI 150-5 (ANH: 02/02->)
 at 4,000 rpm (49.2 kW/L);  at 2,500 rpm — Volkswagen Marine TDI 165-5 (BTW: 04/05-on)
references

2.5 R5 TDI CR 65-120kW
identificationparts code prefix: ???, ID codes: ???
engine configuration & engine displacement inline five-cylinder (R5) Turbocharged Direct Injection (TDI) turbodiesel; ; bore x stroke: , stroke ratio: 0.85:1 - undersquare/long-stroke, 492.1 cc per cylinder, compression ratio: 18.0:1
cylinder block & crankcase grey cast iron GG350; six main bearings, die-forged steel crossplane crankshaft, 'bowl in piston' combustion chamber
cylinder head & valvetrain cast aluminium alloy; two valves per cylinder, 10 valves total, hydraulic bucket tappets with automatic valve clearance compensation, timing belt-driven single overhead camshaft (SOHC), swirl-inducing intake ports
aspiration turbocharger, intercooler; 80 kW and higher: Variable Turbine Geometry (VTG) variable-vane turbocharger
fuel system & engine management common rail (CR) direct injection pump, pressure up to 1,600 bar; Bosch EDC16 electronic engine control unit (ECU)
exhaust system diesel particulate filter (DPF)
DIN-rated power & torque outputs, ID codes
 at 3,500 rpm;  at 2,000 rpm — BJJ
 at 3,500 rpm;  at 2,000 rpm — BJK
 at 3,500 rpm;  at 2,000 rpm — BJL
 at 3,500 rpm;  at 2,000 rpm — BJM
application Volkswagen Crafter
reference

2.5 R5 TDI PD 96-128kW
identification parts code prefix: AXD, ID codes: AXE
engine configuration & engine displacement inline five-cylinder (R5) Turbocharged Direct Injection (TDI) turbodiesel; ; bore x stroke: , stroke ratio: 0.85:1 - undersquare/long-stroke, 492.1 cc per cylinder,[compression ratio: 18.0:1
cylinder block & crankcase aluminum alloy; six main bearings, die-forged steel 5-throw crankshaft, 'bowl in piston' combustion chamber
cylinder head & valvetrain cast aluminum alloy; two valves per cylinder, 10 valves total, hydraulic bucket tappets with automatic valve clearance compensation, gear-driven single overhead camshaft (SOHC), swirl-inducing intake ports
aspiration Variable Turbine Geometry (VTG) variable-vane turbocharger, intercooler
fuel system & engine management camshaft-actuated Bosch Pumpe Düse Unit Injector direct injection
DIN-rated power & torque outputs
  — Volkswagen Transporter (T5)
  at 3,500 rpm;  at 2,000 rpm
applications Volkswagen Touareg, Volkswagen Transporter (T5)

8.9 EU4 169-228kW (Scania)
engine configuration & engine displacement inline five-cylinder, turbodiesel; 
aspiration turbocharger, intercooler
fuel system & engine management Scania PDE high-pressure Unit Injector direct injection system, exhaust gas recirculation, Euro4 compliant
DIN-rated power & torque outputs
  at 1,800 rpm;  at 1,100-1,500 rpm
  at 1,800 rpm;  at 1,100-1,450 rpm
  at 1,800 rpm;  at 1,100-1,350 rpm
applications Scania trucks
reference

9.3 EU5 169-235kW (Scania)
engine configuration & engine displacement inline five-cylinder, turbodiesel; 
aspiration Variable Turbine Geometry (VTG) variable-vane turbocharger, intercooler
fuel system & engine management Cummins / Scania XPI extra-high-pressure common rail direct injection, exhaust gas recirculation, diesel particulate filter, Euro5 compliant
DIN-rated power & torque outputs
  at 1,900 rpm;  at 1,000-1,500 rpm
  at 1,900 rpm;  at 1,000-1,350 rpm
  at 1,900 rpm;  at 1,100-1,200 rpm
applications Scania trucks
references

Six-cylinder diesels

EA 897
VW EA 897 is a diesel engine series of Volkswagen AG, which was developed by Audi. The series comprises six cylinder - V-engines with 3.0 liter displacement and is used in various vehicles of the Volkswagen Group since of 2010. The engines are produced by Audi Hungaria Zrt. in Győr .

2.7 V6 TDI CR 120-140kW
This is a stroke-reduced version of the 3.0 V6 TDI CR
identificationparts code prefix: 4F0
cylinder block & crankcase compacted vermicular graphite cast iron (GJV/CGI); four main bearings, oil cooler
cylinder heads & valvetraincast aluminium alloy; ??????
aspiration single variable-geometry turbine (VGT) turbocharger
DIN-rated power & torque outputs, applications, ID codes
 — Audi A4 (BSG: 11/05-06/08, CAM: 11/07-05/08, CGK: 06/08->), Audi A5 (CAM: 09/07-05/08, CGK: 05/08->), Audi A6 (BSG: 01/05-10/08, CAN: 10/08->)
 at 3,300-4,250 rpm;  at 1,400-3,300 rpm — Audi A4 (BPP: 01/06-03/09), Audi A6 (BPP: 11/04-10/08)
 — Audi A4 (CAM: 11/07-05/08, CGK: 06/08->), Audi A5 (CAM: 07/07-05/08, CGK: 05/08->), Audi A6 (CAN: 10/08->)
references

3.0 V6 24v TDI CR 150–210 kW

This common rail V6 turbodiesel was developed by Audi, and first installed in the Audi D3 A8 in 2004. Subsequently, made available for all longitudinal engined Audis, along with the same engine orientation in Volkswagen Passenger Cars 'premium' models and Volkswagen Marine applications. Also related to VW's diesel emissions scandal.
identification parts code prefix: 059
engine configuration and engine displacement 90° V6 engine, Turbocharged Direct Injection (TDI) turbodiesel; ; bore x stroke: , stroke ratio: 0.91:1 - undersquare/long-stroke, 494.5 cc per cylinder, compression ratio 17.0:1
cylinder block and crankcase compacted vermicular graphite cast iron (GJV/CGI) with UV laser-honed exposed bores; cast bed-plate reinforcing lower bearing frame incorporating four main bearings each affixed with four bolts, balance shaft, die-forged steel crossplane crankshaft with offset crankpins to create an even firing order, simplex roller chain-driven contra-rotating balance shaft mounted within the 'vee', diagonal fracture-split connecting rods, oil-channel–cooled pistons with 'bowl in piston' combustion chamber, two-part oil sump with multi-chamber baffled insert, chain-driven ancillaries, oil filter module (incorporating cyclonic oil separator and water-to-oil cooler) mounted within the 'vee'
cylinder heads & valvetrain cast aluminium alloy; four valves per cylinder, 24 valves total, low-friction roller finger cam followers with hydraulic valve clearance compensation, double overhead camshafts driven by four simplex roller chains and spur gears (hybrid relay method), dual inlet ports, siamesed exhaust ports
aspiration hot-film air mass meter, two separate cast alloy intake manifolds, one BorgWarner variable geometry turbocharger (VGT) with electric boost control fitted within the Vee (water-cooled on Marine variants), maximum absolute pressure , two parallel side-mounted intercoolers (SMICs), sea-water tube intercooler on Marine variants, two cast iron exhaust manifolds (water-cooled on Marine variants)
Dimensions length: , mass:  (automotive),  (Marine variants - dry weight, including DMF, cooling system and all ancillaries)
DIN-rated power and torque outputs, applications, ID codes
 at 3,500 rpm (50.6kW/L, 68.8PS/L);  at 1,400 rpm — Audi B7 A4 (BKN: 11/04-03/09), Audi Q7 4L (CJMA: 10/10-03/15)
 (52.2kW/L, 71.1PS/L) — Audi Q7 (BUN: 03/06-11/07), Volkswagen Touareg (BUN: 04/06-11/07, CAS: 11/07->)
 at 3,250-4,750 rpm (53.9kW/L, 73.4PS/L);  at 1,250-3,000 rpm — Audi A6#C7, Audi A7 (2014+)
 at 4,200 rpm (55.6kW/L, 75.5PS/L);  at 2,000 rpm – Audi C6 A6 (BMK: 04/04-05/06), Volkswagen Phaeton (BMK: 05/04-05/07), Volkswagen Touareg (BKS: 11/04-05/08, CATA: 02/09->), Volkswagen Marine TDI 225-6 (BSP: 02/06->)
 at 4,500 rpm (55.6kW/L, 75.5PS/L);  at 1,500 rpm – 2,500 rpm - Volkswagen Amarok (DDXC: 10/16->)
 at 4,000 rpm (57.6kW/L, 78.2PS/L);  at 1,750 rpm,  between 1,400-3,250 rpm — Audi B7 A4 (ASB: 01/06-03/09), Audi C6 A6 (ASB: 05/06-10/08), Audi D3 A8 (ASB: 01/04->), Audi Q7 (BUG: 03/06-05/08), Volkswagen Phaeton (CARA: 06/07-11/08)
 at 4,000 rpm (59.3kW/L, 80.6PS/L);  at 1,500–3,000 rpm — Audi B7 A4 (CAP: 11/07-05/08), Audi B8 A4 (CCW: 04/08-7/11, CCL: 11/09-7/11>), Audi A5 (CAP: 06/07-05/08, CCW: 03/08->), Audi C6 A6 (CDY: 10/08->), Audi Q5 (CCW: 11/08->), Audi Q7 (CASA: 11/07-05/10, CCMA: 11/08->), Porsche Cayenne (2009->), Volkswagen Phaeton (CARA: 03/07-06/07, CEXA: 06/08-05/10), Volkswagen Touareg (CASA/CASB/CASC: 11/07->)
 at 4,000-4,500 rpm;  at 1,450-3,250 rpm — Audi A4#B8, Audi A5 (2011+); Audi A6#C7, Audi A7 (2010-2014), Volkswagen Touareg (2011+)
 at 4,200 rpm (65.7kW/L, 89.3PS/L);  at 2,000 rpm — Volkswagen Marine TDI 265-6 (CEZA: 12/07->)
 at 3,500-4,250 rpm;  at 1,250-3,250 rpm — Audi A6#C7, Audi A7 (2014-2017)
 at 4,000 rpm;  at 1,750-3,000 rpm — Audi A4, Audi A5, Audi A6#C8, Audi A7, Audi A8, Audi Q7, Audi Q8 (2017+)
references

3.0 V6 24v BiTDI CR 230 kW

DIN-rated power and torque outputs, applications, ID codes
 at 3,900 - 4,500 rpm;  at 1,450 - 2,800 rpm, Audi A6, Audi A7, Audi SQ5 TDI (CVUA: pre-2014)
 at 3,900 - 4,500 rpm;  at 1,450 - 2,800 rpm, Audi A6, Audi A7 (CVUB: 06/2014->)
 at 4,000 - 4,500 rpm;  at 1,450 - 2,800 rpm, Audi A6, Audi A7 (CVUC: 06/2016->)
 at 3,850 - 4,500 rpm;  at 2,500 - 3,100 rpm, Audi S6, Audi S7 (CVU: 05/2019->)

references

11.7 DC12/DT12 EU4 250-353kW (Scania)
engine configuration & engine displacement inline six-cylinder, turbodiesel; 
aspiration turbocharger, intercooler
fuel system & engine management Cummins / Scania HPI high-pressure Unit Injector direct injection system, exhaust gas recirculation, Euro4 compliant
DIN-rated power & torque outputs
  at 1,800 rpm;  at 1,100-1,350 rpm
  at 1,800 rpm;  at 1,100-1,350 rpm
  at 1,900 rpm;  at 1,100-1,350 rpm
  at 1,900 rpm;  at 1,100-1,450 rpm
applications Scania trucks
references

11.7 DC12 EU5 280-309kW (Scania)
engine configuration & engine displacement inline six-cylinder, turbodiesel; 
aspiration turbocharger, intercooler
fuel system & engine management Cummins / Scania HPI high-pressure Unit Injector direct injection, Scania selective catalytic reduction (SCR) - catalytic converter with AdBlue urea injection, Euro5 compliant
DIN-rated power & torque outputs
  at 1,800 rpm;  at 1,100-1,400 rpm
  at 1,800 rpm;  at 1,000-1,400 rpm
applications Scania trucks
references

12.7 DC13 EU5 265-353kW (Scania)
engine configuration & engine displacement inline six-cylinder, turbodiesel; 
aspiration variable-vane geometry turbocharger (VGT), intercooler
fuel system & engine management Cummins / Scania XPI extra-high-pressure common rail direct injection, two-way exhaust gas recirculation, Euro5 compliant
DIN-rated power & torque outputs
  at 1,900 rpm;  at 1,000-1,300 rpm
  at 1,900 rpm;  at 1,000-1,300 rpm
  at 1,900 rpm;  at 1,000-1,300 rpm
  at 1,900 rpm;  at 1,000-1,300 rpm
applications Scania trucks
references

Eight-cylinder diesels

4.2 V8 TDI (Technically  – 4.1 L) CR 235-257kW 
This Audi engine is an entirely redeveloped and bored-out evolution of the superseded 4.0 V8 TDI CR, now with  cylinder spacing between bore centres, and again with roller chain drive for the overhead camshafts and ancillaries. Just like its 4.0 V8 TDI predecessor, this all-new 4.2 V8 TDI retains the mantle of the world's highest power output car with a diesel V8. This engine is manufactured at Győr, Hungary by AUDI AG subsidiary Audi Hungaria Motor Kft.
identification parts code prefix: 057.C
engine configuration & engine displacement 90° V8 engine, Turbocharged Direct Injection (TDI) turbodiesel; ; bore x stroke: , stroke ratio: 0.87:1 - undersquare/long-stroke, 516.7 cc per cylinder,  cylinder spacing, compression ratio: 16.5:1, water-cooled alternator
cylinder block & crankcase compacted vermicular graphite cast iron (GJV/CGI), ; UV laser-honed exposed bore; cast reinforcing bed-plate lower frame incorporating five main bearings (each 'bearing' affixed by four bolts), die-forged chrome molybdenum alloy steel crossplane crankshaft with first and second order forces and moments avoided, three-part oil sump consisting of cast alloy upper section, a middle baffle section and pressed steel lower section, diagonally fracture-split connecting rods, cast aluminium alloy Kolbenschmidt pistons (Mahle on CCFA), simplex roller chain-driven ancillaries, oil filter module (incorporating oil separator and water-to-oil cooler) mounted within the 'vee' (externally mounted on Marine variants)
cylinder heads & valvetrain cast aluminium alloy; four valves per cylinder, 32 valves total, operated by low-friction roller finger cam followers with automatic hydraulic valve clearance compensation, double overhead camshafts - the inlets driven in a relay method at the rear (flywheel) end of the engine by four simplex roller chains and the exhausts driven from the inlets by automatic slack adjusting spur gears at the front end, two unequal-length swirl-inducing switchable inlet ports, siamesed unequal-length exhaust ports
Engines introduced from 2014 include 2 variable geometry turbocharger with maximum  of relative boost pressure.
aspiration - Marine air filter with hot-film air mass meter, one water-cooled turbocharger with electric boost pressure control mounted within the vee, sea-water tube intercooler, two separate cast alloy intake manifolds interconnected by a "feedthrough" system to equalise the pressure in the two cylinder banks, two-position variable swirl flaps integrated into the intake tract
fuel system & engine management common rail (CR) direct diesel injection: electric low-pressure fuel lift pump, one timing belt-driven  injection pump, two common rail fuel rails (one per cylinder bank), piezo-electric operated fuel injectors with eight-hole nozzles for homogeneous fuel delivery, single and double pilot injection, up to four main injection actuations per piston cycle; Bosch EDC16 CP electronic engine control unit (ECU), Bosch MDC Marine Diesel Control on Marine variant.
exhaust system two air-gap insulated fan-branch alloy steel exhaust manifolds, two close-coupled maintenance-free oxidizing catalytic converters, two silicon carbide diesel particulate filters, Euro4 emissions standard compliant
dimensions length: , mass:  (automotive -  lighter than its 4.0 V8 TDI predecessor,  lighter than the all-aluminium alloy Mercedes-Benz 4.0 V8 CDI diesel engine),  (Marine variant: dry weight, including DMF, cooling system & all ancillaries)
DIN-rated power & torque outputs, ID codes
BMC: 
BVN:  at 3,750 rpm;  at 1,600-3,500 rpm
BTR:  at 3,750 rpm;  at 1,800-2,500 rpm
CCFA: 
CEM:  at 4,200 rpm;  at 1,900 rpm
CTEC:  at 3,750 rpm;  at 2,000-2,750 rpm
applications
 Audi D3 A8 4.2 TDI quattro (BMC: 01/05-06/05, BVN: 07/05->), Audi Q7 4.2 TDI (BTR: 03/07-06/09, CCFA: 06/09->), Volkswagen Marine TDI 350-8 (CEM: 02/09->), Volkswagen Touareg, Porsche Cayenne
references

4.0 V8 TDI 310-320kW 
A successor to the 4.2 TDI. The engine includes 2 turbochargers, 48-volt electrical system, 7 kW electric compressor, Bosch CRS 3.25 engine management.

A turbocharger serves to supply engine boost and spools up the passive turbocharger.

identification
 parts code prefix: EA 898
engine configuration & engine displacement 90° V8 engine, Turbocharged Direct Injection (TDI) turbodiesel; ; bore x stroke: , stroke ratio: 0.91:1 - undersquare/long-stroke, 494.5 cc per c[ylinder,  cylinder spacing, compression ratio: 16.0:1, water-cooled alternator

DIN-rated power and torque outputs, applications, ID codes 
 at 3,500-5,000 rpm;  at 1,000-3,250 rpm, Porsche Panamera II 4S Diesel

 at 3,750-5,000 rpm;  at 1,000-3,250 rpm, Audi SQ7 2016–2020, Audi SQ8 2019–2020, Audi A8 D5, Bentley Bentayga,2020-
VW Touareg

Production
The engine was developed in Ingolstadt.

15.6 V8 DC16 368-544kW (Scania)

engine configuration & engine displacement 90° V8 engine, turbodiesel; ; bore x stroke: , stroke ratio: 0.82:1 - undersquare/long-stroke, 1,950.8 cc per cylinder
aspiration turbocharger, intercooler
fuel system & engine management Scania PDE high-pressure Unit Injector system, Scania selective catalytic reduction (SCR) - catalytic converter with AdBlue urea injection
DIN-rated power & torque outputs - Euro4
  at 1,900 rpm;  at 1,100-1,400 rpm
  at 1,900 rpm;  at 1,100-1,400 rpm
  at 1,900 rpm;  at 1,100-1,400 rpm
DIN-rated power & torque outputs - Euro5
  at 1,800 rpm;  at 1,000-1,350 rpm
  at 1,900 rpm;  at 1,000-1,400 rpm
  at 1,900 rpm;  at 1,000-1,400 rpm
  at 2,000 rpm;  at 1,000-1,400 rpm reference: https://web.archive.org/web/20121112032602/http://www3.scania.com/en/New-V8-truck-range/The-new-730hp-engine/
applications Scania trucks
references

Ten-cylinder diesels

4.9 V10 20V TDI PD 230kW
identification engine code: AJS
engine configuration & engine displacement 90° V10 engine, Turbocharged Direct Injection (TDI) turbodiesel; ; bore x stroke: , 492.1 cc per cylinder
applications Volkswagen Touareg V10 TDI (2002-2008)
  Volkswagen Phaeton V10 TDI 4motion (2003-2007)

Twelve-cylinder diesels

5.9 V12 48V TDI CR DPF 368kW

identification parts code prefix: 05A
engine configuration & engine displacement 60° V12 engine, Turbocharged Direct Injection (TDI) turbodiesel; ; bore x stroke: , stroke ratio: 0.91:1 - undersquare/long-stroke, 494.5 cc per cylinder;  cylinder spacing;  cylinder bank offset; compression ratio: 16.0:1; two oil coolers (one: water/oil, the other: air/oil); four coolant radiators; water-cooled alternator
cylinder block & crankcase GJV-450 compacted vermicular graphite cast iron (GJV/CGI); nodular graphite reinforced cast iron bedplate frame with seven main bearings and four bolts per bearing, die-forged chrome and molybdenum steel alloy crossplane crankshaft, diagonally fracture-cracked forged connecting rods, aluminium forged Mahle pistons, two-part cast aluminium alloy baffled oil sump
cylinder heads & valvetrain composite lower section made from low-pressure die cast aluminium alloy with integrated intake and exhaust ports, middle section for guiding engine oil flow, and the top section is a pressure-cast ladder frame for the overhead camshafts; four valves per cylinder, 48 valves total, low-friction roller finger cam followers with automatic hydraulic valve clearance compensation, double overhead camshaft - the exhaust camshafts driven from the flywheel side via a two-stage chain drive utilising three 3/8" simplex roller chains, and the inlet camshafts driven from the exhaust camshafts by gears at the front of the engine; two unequal-length swirl-inducing switchable inlet ports, siamesed unequal-length exhaust ports
fuel system & engine management Bosch  common rail (CR) (one rail per cylinder bank) direct injection: with two chain-driven high-pressure fuel pumps, fuel cooler for return line, twelve combustion chamber-sited eight-hole piezo injectors with multi-pulse injection (up to five injection operations per piston cycle, including pre- and post- ignition injection); two Bosch EDC electronic engine control units (ECUs) working on the 'master and slave' concept; water-cooled vacuum-actuated exhaust gas recirculation (EGR) with up to 50% recirculation rate at partial engine load; European Euro5 emissions standard compliant
exhaust system double flow exhaust pipes with two catalysts and two diesel particulate filters (DPF); two lambda sensors, two exhaust gas temperature sensors
dimensions length:  (just  longer than the V8 TDI),
application Audi Q7 V12 TDI quattro (09/08->)
references

Diesel engines data table
The following table contains a very brief selection of current and historical Volkswagen Group compression-ignition diesel engines for comparison of performance and operating characteristics:

See also
 List of Volkswagen Group petrol engines
G-Lader
G60 - for detailed development info and progression of forced induction in Volkswagen Group engines
 List of engines used in Chrysler products

References

External links
VolkswagenAG.com - Volkswagen Group corporate website
Chemnitz (Germany) - engine plant Mobility and Sustainability
Kassel (Germany) - engine plant Mobility and Sustainability
Salzgitter (Germany) - engine plant Mobility and Sustainability
Polkowice (Poland) - engine plant Mobility and Sustainability
São Carlos (Brazil) - engine plant Mobility and Sustainability
Shanghai (China) - engine plant Mobility and Sustainability
Audi at a glance - includes information on the Győr engine plant 
Audi-TDI-chronicle.com - official Audi history and timeline of the TDI engine

Diesel engines by model
Marine diesel engines
Lists of automobile engines